Bedellia orchilella, the Hawaiian sweet potato leaf miner, is a moth of the family Bedelliidae. It was first described by Lord Walsingham in 1907. It is endemic to the Hawaiian islands of Kauai, Oahu, Molokai, Maui and Hawaii.

The larvae feed on Ipomoea species, including I. tuberculata. They mine the leaves of their host plant. It is considered a pest on sweet potatoes in Hawaii. The mines may cause the yellowing of the leaves, giving them a notched and withered appearance.

External links

Bedelliidae
Leaf miners
Endemic moths of Hawaii
Moths described in 1907